Lucille Benson (July 17, 1914 – February 17, 1984) was an American character actress.

Biography

Personal life
Born in  Scottsboro, Alabama, on July 17, 1914, Benson was adopted by her aunt, Mrs. John Benson, after her mother died of tuberculosis. She was valedictorian and president of her class at Jackson County High School. She attended Huntingdon College in Montgomery, and later attended Northwestern's School of Drama in Evanston, Illinois. After a short career as a teacher, she went to New York in the 1930s.

Acting career
Benson's career began in New York in the 1930s. She appeared on Broadway in several plays including Ladies Night in a Turkish Bath, Walking Happy, Hotel Paradiso, Good Night, Ladies, The Doughgirls, The Day Before Spring, Happy Birthday, As The Girls Go, Hotel Paradiso, and Period of Adjustment. She performed at the Coconut Grove Playhouse in Miami, appearing in the Tennessee Williams play Orpheus Descending.

Benson's break in motion pictures came while performing with Donald O'Connor in the play Little Me during a three-month run in Las Vegas. She said "While I was in Las Vegas, a former agent in Hollywood called to ask me to come to Hollywood to try out for a Paramount film. I went to Hollywood, tried out and was cast for the part in which I played opposite Robert Redford in Little Fauss and Big Halsy." 

Benson played a lady running a roadside "Snakerama" exhibit in Steven Spielberg's 1971 movie Duel, starring Dennis Weaver. She worked with Spielberg again in 1979, in 1941, as a gas station owner whom John Belushi orders to refuel his fighter plane.

In Silver Streak (1976), Benson portrayed rancher Rita Babtree, who comes to Gene Wilder's rescue by ferrying him in her bi-plane.  

Benson portrayed Birdie Huff in the crime drama Nashville 99 (1977). She had a recurring role on the sitcom The Ropers as Helen's mother. Her big commercial break was Bosom Buddies, a situation comedy based on Some Like It Hot. During the show's first season (1980–1981), Benson played Lilly Sinclair, the manager of the female-only hotel where two young men (Tom Hanks and Peter Scolari) dress as women to take advantage of the inexpensive rent.

She may be the actress seen reciting the Lord's Prayer in the train holdup scene of the Butch Cassidy and the Sundance Kid (1969). However, the actress is uncredited. She did work with the stars of that film in the following year: with Paul Newman in WUSA and with Robert Redford in Little Fauss and Big Halsy.

Benson played Mrs. Elrod in the 1981 John Carpenter horror movie Halloween II.

Death
Benson died on February 17, 1984, in a hospital in Scottsboro, Alabama, aged 69, from liver cancer. She was cremated and her remains are buried under a modest bronze headstone, at Cedar Hill Cemetery, in her hometown of Scottsboro.

Filmography

 The Fugitive Kind (1960) - Beulah Binnings
 WUSA (1970) - Second Matron
 Little Fauss and Big Halsy (1970) - 'Mom' Fauss
 Women in Chains (1972) - Billie
 Escape (1971) - Trudy
 Duel (1971) - Lady at Snakerama
 Cactus in the Snow (1971) - Mrs. Sawyer
 Delphi Bureau (1972) - Mrs. Loveless
 Slaughterhouse-Five (1972) - Billy's Mother
 Private Parts (1972) - Aunt Martha
 The Devil's Daughter (1972) - Janet Poole
 Tom Sawyer (1973) - Widow Douglas
 The Blue Knight (1973) - Elmira Gooch
 Mame (1974) - Mother Burnside
 Huckleberry Finn (1974) - Widow Douglas
 The Day the Earth Moved (1974) - Miss Virginia Porter
 Reflections of Murder (1974) - Mrs. Turner
 Betrayal (1974) - Eunice Russell
 Collision Course (1976) - Bess Truman
 Silver Streak (1976) - Rita Babtree
 The Greatest (1977) - Mrs. Fairlie
 Black Market Baby (1977) - Mrs. Krieg
 Charleston (1979) - Miss Fay
 Ebony, Ivory and Jade (1979) - Mrs. Stone
 Concrete Cowboys (1979) - Peg the Madam
 1941 (1979) - Gas Mama (Eloise)
 Amy (1981) - Rose Metcalf
 Halloween II (1981) - Mrs. Elrod
 When Your Lover Leaves (1983) - Greta
 Moon Face (released after her death in 1984)

Television appearances
 The New Andy Griffith Show (1971) - Mrs. Gaddis
 Cannon (1971) - Proprietress
 Bonanza (1972) - Mrs. Melody
 Mannix (1972-1974) - Myra / Ida
 Emergency! (1973-1976) - Annie / Martha
 The Day the Earth Moved (1974 TV movie) - Miss Virginia Porter 
 Police Woman (1976) - Aunt Benjamin
 The Waltons (1976) - Tilly Shanks
 Petrocelli (1974-1976) - Lucille Davis / Madge Briar / Lucille Field / Angie Crawford
 Nashville 99 (1977) - Birdie Huff
 The New Adventures of Wonder Woman (1978) - Flo
 Eight Is Enough (1978)
 How the West Was Won (1978-1979) - Miss Agnes / Miss Walker
 Trapper John, M.D. (1979) - Clarissa Mae Purcell
 Little House on the Prairie (1979) - Miss Trimble
 The Ropers (1979-1980) - Mother
 The Dukes of Hazzard (1980) - Mama Coltrane
 Bosom Buddies (1980-1981) - Lilly Sinclair
 The Love Boat (1981) - Doris
 Simon & Simon (1982) - Mrs. Dorothy Bartlett
 The Wonderful World of Disney (1978-1982) - Mrs. Levelor / Grandma Hopkins
 Bring 'Em Back Alive (1982)
 Alice (1982-1983) - Grace / Lucille (final television appearance)

References

External links

 

1914 births
1984 deaths
People from Scottsboro, Alabama
Actresses from Alabama
American film actresses
American television actresses
Huntingdon College alumni
Northwestern University School of Communication alumni
Deaths from cancer in Alabama
Deaths from liver cancer
20th-century American actresses